Go to the Beds, stylized as GO TO THE BEDS was a Japanese alternative idol girl group formed in 2020 after the split of Gang Parade. The group ceased activities as Go to the Beds and resumed activities as Gang Parade at the beginning of 2022.

History

2020: Formation and Go to the Beds
Following the announcement of Saki Kamiya's graduation from Gang Parade, it was announced that Gang Parade would split into two groups: Go to the Beds, consisting of Miki Yamamachi, Yua Yumeno, Can GP Maika, Yui Ga Dockson and Coco Partin Coco, and Paradises, consisting of Yuka Terashima, Usagi Tsukino, Naruhaworld. They released the split EP, G/P, consisting of three songs per group and Saki Kamiya's final solo song on April 1, 2020. They released their eponymous debut album on July 22.

2021–2022: Reincarnation, Blood Compact, line-up swap and return to Gang Parade
They released their first solo EP, Reincarnation, on January 13, 2021. On March 27, it was announced that a new member, Changbaby, would join the group. She made her first appearance as a member on May 2. They released their second EP, Blood Compact, on July 21. On October 2, it was announced that all members of Go to the Beds and Paradises would immediately swap groups. They released a second split EP, G⇔P, on December 15. On January 2, 2022, Go to the Beds ceased activities and returned to Gang Parade.

Members

Initial line-up

Swap line-up

Timeline

Discography

Studio albums

Extended plays

Singles

Collaborations

References

Japanese idol groups
Japanese pop music groups
Musical groups established in 2020
Musical groups from Tokyo
2020 establishments in Japan